Adrian Mannarino was the defending champion but decided not to participate.

Falla won the title, defeating Steven Diez in the final, 6–2, 6–2.

Seeds

Draw

Finals

Top half

Bottom half

References
 Main Draw
 Qualifying Draw

Internationaux de Nouvelle-Calédonie
BNP Paribas de Nouvelle-Caledonie - Singles